Oratory of Saint Lawrence all'alpe Seccio ( is a Roman Catholic church in the village of Boccioleto, in the Province of Vercelli and the region of Piedmont, Italy.

The oratory situated 1380 metres above sea level is reachable only by a trail that winds through forests of beech trees until you reach the alpine pastures, overlooking Cavaione Valley, a side valley of the Sermenza Valley. The interior contains a cycle of frescoes painted by an unknown artist during the mid-fifteenth century.

External links

Boccioleto
15th-century Roman Catholic church buildings in Italy
Boccioleto